Élan Vital is the third and final studio album by Pretty Girls Make Graves, released by Matador Records on March 4, 2006 in Australia and April 11, 2006 in the US. It is the first album with new keyboardist Leona Marrs.

The title is based on the philosophical idea, élan vital.

Track listing
"The Nocturnal House" – 4:04
"Pyrite Pedestal" – 3:26
"The Number" – 3:09
"Parade" – 2:40
"Domino" – 3:38
"Interlude" – 1:18
"The Magic Hour" – 3:16
"Selling the Wind" – 3:54
"Pearls on a Plate" – 3:46
"Pictures of a Night Scene" – 2:52
"Wildcat" – 3:11
"Bullet Charm" – 6:43

Personnel
Andrea Zollo – vocals
Nick Dewitt – drums, samples, vocals, trumpet, piano
Derek Fudesco – bass guitar, vocals
J. Clark – guitar, drums, keyboard, saxophone, trumpet, vocals, programming
Leona Marrs – keyboards, accordion, piano, melodica, vocals

Pretty Girls Make Graves albums
2006 albums
Matador Records albums